Teoponte is a village in the La Paz Department, Bolivia.

The village is served by Teoponte Airport.

References 

  Instituto Nacional de Estadistica de Bolivia  (INE)

Populated places in La Paz Department (Bolivia)